Allen Hewitt Wellons (born March 12, 1949) is an American attorney and Democratic politician. The onetime campaign manager for 11th district state senator Jim Speed, he succeeded the longtime lawmaker after he retired in 1996. Wellons ran for reelection in the newly drawn 12th district in 2002 but lost to Republican Johnston County commissioner Fred Smith. In 2020, he decided to run again for the Senate, challenging state representative Lisa Stone Barnes to succeed the retiring Rick Horner.

References

External links
Campaign website

Living people
1949 births
Democratic Party North Carolina state senators
People from Smithfield, North Carolina
20th-century American politicians
21st-century American politicians